Scott C. Weaver is an American virologist who is the research director of Galveston National Laboratory.

References

External links 
 https://www.youtube.com/watch?v=r7kMhCowCfg

Year of birth missing (living people)
Living people
Zika virus
Place of birth missing (living people)
American virologists